Ten Boom is a rather uncommon Dutch toponymic surname meaning "at the tree". It may refer to:

 Corrie ten Boom (1892–1983),  author and Holocaust survivor who helped many Jews escape the Nazis during World War II
 Betsie ten Boom (1885–1944), Corrie's sister, also helped hide Jews in their home
 Casper ten Boom (1859–1944), father of Corrie and Betsie, also helped save Jews

References

Dutch-language surnames
Toponymic surnames